At  high, Slavnik is one of the highest peaks of the Slovenian Istria. It is part of the Čičarija landscape. At its peak stands a broadcast transmitter.

It is distinguished by very broad panoramic view. In the direction of north-east one can see in the distance Kamnik-Savinja Alps and closer Nanos, Vremščica, Brkini. To the east one can see Javorniki, Trojica and Snežnik, in the distance also Gorski Kotar, Risnjak, Snježnik. From the east to the south there is Kvarner bay, before that Planik and Učka and Čičarija, as well as Istria. Towards the west one can see the coast of the Adriatic sea and places like Umag, Piran, Koper, Trieste, also Venice. From the west to the north one case see Dolomites, Julian Alps including the highest mountain in Slovenia Triglav, as well as the Karawanks.

References

External links

Mountains of the Slovene Littoral
Istria
One-thousanders of Slovenia